Zhang Beisan (born 1952), Chinese diplomat,
is the former Ambassador to Angola and Portugal of the People's Republic of China.

Early life 
He replaced Jiang Yuande as the Chinese Ambassador to Angola from 2002 through 2005 under the appointment of the then-Chinese President Jiang Zemin,
and was succeeded by Zhang Bolun in May 2008.
He was then appointed Ambassador to Portugal, in place of Gao Kexiang.

On 25 February 2013, the then-Chinese President Hu Jintao announced the appointment of Huang Songfu as new Ambassador to Portugal.

See also
Sino-Angolan relations
Sino-Portuguese relations

Notes and references

Ambassadors of China to Portugal
Ambassadors of China to Angola
1952 births
Living people
Chinese Communist Party politicians from Zhejiang
People's Republic of China politicians from Zhejiang